Montagu House or Montague House may refer to:

England 
Montagu House, Bloomsbury, former mansion that became first home of the British Museum, also known as Montague House, since demolished
(a slang term for British Museum, on Great Russell Street, London, on site of former mansion)
Montagu House, Portman Square, built for Elizabeth Montagu on Portman Square
Montagu House, Whitehall, another London mansion
Montagu House, Blackheath

United States 
Henry Montague House, Kalamazoo, Michigan, listed on the National Register of Historic Places

Australia 
Monty House (Montague Grant House, born 1946), Western Australian politician

See also
Montacute House
Montague (disambiguation)
Montagu (disambiguation)